Sainte-Croix-sur-Buchy (literally Sainte-Croix on Buchy) is a commune in the Seine-Maritime department in the Normandy region in northern France.

The inhabitants of the town of Sainte-Croix-sur-Buchy are called Saint-Cruciens, Saint-Cruciennes in French.

Geography

Population

Places of interest
 The church of St. Croix, dating from the sixteenth century.
 The church of St. Médard & St. Godard, dating from the twelfth century.
 Traces of the chateau du Grand Beslel.
 The seventeenth-century stone cross in the cemetery.

See also
Communes of the Seine-Maritime department

References

Communes of Seine-Maritime